Barbara J. Bloemink (born 1953) is an American art historian and former director and chief curator of five art and design museums. She has published several works on the modernist painter Florine Stettheimer (1871–1944) and is considered an expert on the artist.

Early life and education
Bloemink is the daughter of Doris and Robert Heins and was born in 1953. Her mother and grandmother were both artists and art teachers in schools in New York and her father was an engineer. The family lived abroad for much of her childhood, allowing her to gain an appreciation for international art from a young age. When they returned stateside, the family lived in Rye, New York, where Bloemink completed her secondary education at White Plains High School. After graduating, she attended Stanford University, earning a bachelor's degree with distinction in art history. Continuing her education, Bloemink completed a master's degree in fine and decorative arts at the New York University Institute of Fine Arts and finished another master's in philosophy at Yale. In 1990, she began working on her PhD at Yale University. Her dissertation was published in 1995, as The Life and Art of Florine Stettheimer.

Career
Bloemink began her career working at Sotheby's as a director for European paintings and then worked for two and a half years on Madison Avenue as an account executive. In 1988, she was hired by the Hudson River Museum in Yonkers, New York, as chief curator. The following year, she became the director of the museum. Leaving Hudson River to complete her PhD, while Bloemink conducted research on Florine Stettheimer, she mounted an exhibit of Stettheimer's works at the Katonah Museum of Art in 1992. During her studies, she served as an adjunct curator at both the Katonah and Mint Museums, respectively in Katonah, New York and Charlotte, North Carolina. Bloemink became the curator and director of the Kemper Museum of Contemporary Art in Kansas City, Missouri in 1994. Resigning in 1996, she returned to New York, curating such events as a biennial exhibition of contemporary art in Puebla, Mexico, writing reviews of contemporary Colombian art for ArtNexus and organizing an exhibit on African-American art for the Katonah Museum. 

Between 1997 and 1999, Bloemink was the curator and director of at the Virginia Museum of Contemporary Art in Virginia Beach, Virginia.  She then briefly worked as a director at Hirschl & Adler Modern in New York, before becoming managing director of the Guggenheim-Hermitage and the Guggenheim Las Vegas Museums in Las Vegas, Nevada in 2001. Bloemink returned to New York City in 2002, to serve as the curatorial director of the Smithsonian's National Design Museum, Cooper-Hewitt. Bloemink was a founding Board Member of Design Miami in 2003, participating in and moderating a number of panels for Design Miami and ArtBasel Miami events. In 2007, Bloemink left Cooper-Hewitt for a post as deputy director of curatorial affairs at the Museum of Arts and Design in New York City and began working as an independent curator and museum consultant for the new Design Museum in Holon, Israel, where she co-curated the opening international exhibition. Simultaneously, with her curatorial work she lectured globally and published books on various topics regarding art and design. 

In 2010, Bloemink moved to Snowmass Village, Colorado to work as the director of the Anderson Ranch Arts Center.  As an adjunct professor Bloemink has taught courses in art history, museum studies and senior fine art seminars at the college and graduate level. These have included instruction at the University of Kansas, Kansas City, Missouri, the University of Brighton in England, the School of Visual Arts in New York City, and the University of Bezalel in Israel. She has served as a panelist for many international conferences and juried national art exhibitions. In 2015, Bloemink was a fellow at the BAU Foundation in Otranto, Italy and the following year, served as a director of their Artists and Writers Residency program in Apulia.

Curatorial work

For over three decades, Bloemink has organized over eighty exhibitions of modernist and contemporary art and design internationally. These have included many one person exhibitions as well as group exhibitions.

Solo exhibitions
Among the solo artist exhibitions: "Florine Stettheimer: Manhattan Fantastica", Whitney Museum of American Art, 1995; "Guerrilla Girls: Posters of Protest", Kemper Museum, 1996; "Deborah Kass: My Andy, A Retrospective", Kemper Museum, 1996; "Michael Lucero: Influences & Contexts", traveling exhibit, 1996; "Christian Boltanski: So Far", Kemper Museum, 1998; "James Croak: Twenty-Five Year Survey", Contemporary Art Center of Virginia, 1998; "Yinka Shonibare Selects Works from the Permanent Collection", Cooper-Hewitt National Design Museum, 2005; and "Esteban Lisa: Playing with Lines and Colors", Museum of Latin American Art, 2012. 

The 1995 exhibit on Stettheimer was widely viewed as the rediscovery of the artist's work, as it had not been widely exhibited since 1946. The essays, written by Bloemink and Elisabeth Sussman for the exhibition catalogue, examined Stettheimer's career and the interwar years in New York City from a feminist perspective. The essays attempted to open the artist's work to explorations which not only reinstated her place in art history, but to broaden the context of its interpretation into postmodern relevance. The exhibition was described as showing the artist's wit as well as her ferocity, not only in the subject matter she chose to paint, but also in the garish, bold colors she preferred. The Guerilla Girls' 1996 exhibition featured posters aimed at uncovering discrimination in the art world. Kass's retrospective held later that year, derided the male-dominated iconography of pop art, parodying Andy Warhol's style with feminist messaging. Art critic Alice Thorson noted the unmistakable imprint of Bloemink's curation of Kass's exhibition. 

The Lucero exhibit, co-curated by Bloemink and Mark Richard Leach, opened at the Mint Museum of Art in Charlotte, and then traveled to the American Craft Museum in New York City, the Kemper Museum in Kansas City, Missouri, the Smithsonian National Museum of American Art in Washington, D.C., and the Carnegie Museum of Art in Pittsburgh, Pennsylvania. Featuring an unconventional style, Lucero's work defied being classed as either ceramics or sculpture, though it was predominantly made of clay. Face jugs, hybrid animals, and found items in mixed-media attempted to address current events and explore traditions in new ways. For example, a found item, an antique stroller, was presented to provoke thought on recycling. Bloemink discussed in the event catalogue, the influences of Dada and surrealism in Lucero's works. The exhibit held in 1998 of Boltanski's work was organized by Bloemink prior to her leaving the Kemper Museum. The exhibit featured works by the artist from 1980 through the present, and was shown under the direction of Dana Self. Boltanski used ordinary objects, like photographs, clothing, newspaper clippings, and household items to explore the history behind people's identity. Some of the works featured memorials to Holocaust victims, while his work Les Ombres used hanging skeletons to project shadows on walls. 

Croak's 1998 exhibit was the first retrospective exhibition of his work. His works use unusual media, such as skins, dirt, and resins to examine the environment, evolution, human nature, and cultural values. In 2004, Bloemink hired a group of guest curators to work with her on a series of exhibits. One of these, British-Nigerian artist Shonibare, selected for the 2005 to 2006 exhibition objects from the Cooper-Hewitt collection combining items from the Americas to Asia, spanning multiple centuries and continents to explore the idea of travel. The 2012 retrospective exhibition on the works of Lisa, featured the artist's works from 1930 to 1970 and was the first solo presentation of his art in the United States. It was co-curated by Barbara Bloemink and Jorge Virgili. Bloemink had introduced Lisa, an Argentine modernist and one of the first abstract artists in Latin America, with an exhibition at Hirschl & Adler Gallery in 2000.

Multi-artist exhibitions
Group exhibitions organized and/or co-curated by Bloemink cover a broad spectrum. For example, "A Natural Order: The Experience of Landscape in Contemporary Sculpture" appeared at the Hudson River Museum of Art, Yonkers, New York, in 1990. The exhibit, which included an array of international artists, explored the importance of art in preserving images of the natural environment through time, noting that future generations may not be able to see the same habitats. "Re-Righting History: Counter-Narratives by Contemporary African-American Artists", was shown at the Katonah Museum of Art, Katonah, New York, in 1999. It evaluated the omission of African-American experiences from the historic record and national narrative. Presenting the work of nineteen artists, Bloemink curated an event which wove images of slavery's impact on families, with the stereotypical depictions of black life as represented in cinema, lynchings and mixed-media works which examine defining social attitudes towards Black Americans throughout history. Bloemink was co-curator with Vicky A. Clark of "Comic Release: Negotiating Identity for a New Generation", which toured after opening at the Pittsburgh Contemporary Art Center, Pittsburgh, Pennsylvania in 2003. The traveling exhibit explored the questions of class, gender, and race, through artistic works of artists typically known for drawing cartoons or for comic books, and graffiti work. 

Other group exhibitions curated by Bloemink include "Design ≠Art: Functional Sculpture from Donald Judd to Rachel Whiteread" co-curated with Joseph Cunningham for the Smithsonian National Design Museum, New York City, in 2004. The exhibit explored the crossover between function, design, and art. Presenting works by varied artists, the minimalist approach of unadorned pieces, allowed viewers to determine if each work was merely functional, like a piece of furniture, or sculpture, for ornamentation. "Fashion in Colors", was organized by Bloemink for the Smithsonian National Design Museum in 2006. It explored how color and its underlying meaning in different time periods was reflected in the fashions of varying eras. For example, in the seventeenth century, black denoted conservatism and respectability, whereas from the 1960s, it came to represent subcultural rebellion, such as in the dress of beatniks, punks, and goths. Each room of the exhibit focused on a different color with clothing in the same color providing social meaning. The 2006 exhibition, "Frederic Church, Winslow Homer, and Thomas Moran: Tourism and the American Landscape" was hosted by the Smithsonian National Design Museum. Bloemink's curation explored the impact of the artists in shaping the American identity how Americans and tourists saw the country. Though Church, Homer, and Moran were known for beautiful landscapes and character studies, each of them had images used in advertising, to illustrate newspaper and magazine articles, and for stereoscopes, solidifying American values and marketing them to a wider audience. "The State of Things: International Design Triennial", was the inaugural exhibition of the Contemporary Design Museum, Holon, Israel. Opening in 2010, the exhibit, held in a new facility designed by Ron Arad and curated by Bloemink, looked at design showcasing current technology as it impacts humans in a world in which many experience helplessness, greed, loneliness, and war.

Art and design writing 
In addition to numerous books on early twentieth century and artists, topics exploring art history and contemporary art and design, Bloemink has published numerous international catalog essays, magazine, newspaper, and on-line articles on modernist and contemporary art and design in several media. A number have to do with the artist Florine Stettheimer, such as her chapter, "Florine Settheimer: Hiding in Plain Sight" in Naomi Sawelson-Gorse's Women in Dada and "Crystal Flowers, Pink Candy Hearts, and Tinsel Creation: The Subversive Femininity of Florine Stettheimer" in Bridget Elliott and Janice Helland's Women Artists and the Decorative Arts, 1880–1935: The Gender of Ornament. A review of her 1995 The Life and Art of Florence Stettheimer in Art Journal said that she "rescues [Stettheimer's] work from frothy, faux naif, interpretations and unequivolcally positions it within advance currents of art and thought". By researching people who had been identified in other portraits and novels, and notes by art critic Henry McBride, and Stettheimer's sister, Ettie, Bloemink recreated the artist's circle of friends to give a clearer picture of the influences from notations in Settheimer's diaries and letters. Art historian and gender specialist Wendy Slatkin called Bloemink "the leading scholar" on Stettheimer. Her 2022 book Florine Stettheimer: A Biography was listed by The New Yorker as one of "The Best Books of 2022".

Personal life 
Bloemink is married. She has worked as an actor and has been a part of the Hudson Classical Theater Company.  In 2021 Bloemink performed the role of Boyet in their production of William Shakespeare's Love's Labour's Lost in New York City.

Selected publications

 Florine Stettheimer: A Biography, (Hirmer Publishers, January 5,)
 Design Does Not Equal Art: Functional Objects from Donald Judd to Rachel Whiteread, (Merrell Publishers Ltd, September 17, 2004) ASIN: BO13PRN1UU
 Element 47: The Art Collection, (Marquand Books, January 27,)
 Spill: Daniel Beltrá & The Gulf Horizon Oil Spill (GOST Books, March 17, 2015: 
 With Soon Chun Cho, The Color of Nature: Monochrome Art in Korea (Assouline,)
 With Lolis Elie and Claire Tancons, Prospect 1: New Orleans (PictureBox, November 1,)
 With Vicky Clark, Comic Release: Negotiating Identity for a New Generation, (D.A.P./Distributed Art Publishers,)
 With Cynthia Smith, Design for the Other 90%, (Editions Assouline, May 15,)
 With Soon Chun Cho, Empty the Mind: The Art of Park Seo-Bo (Assouline, September 15,)
 With Mark Leach, Michael Lucero: Sculpture 1976–1995 (Hudson Hills, March 13,)
 The Life and Art of Florine Stettheimer (Yale University Press,  August 30, 1995: 
 With Elizabeth Sussman, Florine Stettheimer: Manhattan Fantastica (Whitney Museum of American Art, September 1,)
 With Gail Collins, Re-Righting History: Contemporary African American Artists (Katonah Museum of Art, January 1,)

References

Citations

Bibliography

 

 

 

</ref>

External links

Barbara J. Bloemink on Facebook

1953 births
Living people
Stanford University alumni
New York University Institute of Fine Arts alumni
Yale University alumni
20th-century American women writers
American art curators
American art historians
American women curators
Women art historians
21st-century American historians
American women historians
20th-century American historians
21st-century American women writers